Bhoirwadi is an area located in Hinjawadi Phase-3, Pune, in the state of Maharashtra, India. It is under the jurisdiction of Hinjawadi and Pune Metropolitan Region Development Authority (PMRDA). The Rajiv Gandhi Infotech Park Phase-3 and International Tech Park are located in this area. Bhoirwadi is well connected and near Balewadi, Baner, Aundh, Pune. Bhoirwadi used to be a village, but now it has been drastically transformed into an affluent, developed area with multinational companies and residential high-rises.

Economy
Companies situated here include Tata Consultancy Services, Capgemini, Infosys, Congnigent and Tech Mahindra. International Tech Park is a 25-acre global IT park located in Bhoirwadi. This location is classified as an IT/ITES Special Economic Zone (SEZ).

Transportation

Bhoirwadi (Megapolis Circle) Hinjawadi Line-3 Pune Metro Railways

Metro Railway: Line 3 (Pune Metro)- Bhoirwadi has been connected with Metro Railway through Megapolis Circle Station. The Hinjawadi Metro is under construction; it goes through Bhoirwadi up to Megapolis Circle.

Bhoirwadi Bus Transport

Air-conditioned bus services are provided for the commuters of Hinjawadi, Maan and Bhoirwadi. Non-air-conditioned buses are also available.

References

External links
  Villages in Mulshi taluka 
  Villages in pune maharashtra
 List of Villages in Mulshi Tehsil

Villages in Mulshi taluka